Carlos Andres Berna Gonzalez (born 21 January 1990 in Carepa) is a Colombian weightlifter. He competed at the 2012 Summer Olympics in the Men's 56 kg, finishing 8th. He also competed at the 2015 Pan American Games.

References

External links
 

Colombian male weightlifters
1990 births
Living people
Olympic weightlifters of Colombia
Weightlifters at the 2012 Summer Olympics
Weightlifters at the 2015 Pan American Games
Pan American Games medalists in weightlifting
Pan American Games silver medalists for Colombia
Sportspeople from Antioquia Department
Medalists at the 2015 Pan American Games
20th-century Colombian people
21st-century Colombian people